The shooting of Christopher Penley, a 15-year-old boy, occurred on January 13, 2006, at Milwee Middle School in Longwood, Florida. During class, Penley took out an Airsoft gun that was designed to look realistic. Penley ran from the room and eventually entered a restroom area.  SWAT officers arrived on the scene and tried to negotiate with him. Penley pointed the Airsoft gun at an officer, who responded by shooting Penley.

Shooting
Penley had briefly taken classmate Maurice Cotey hostage in a classroom and then later barricaded himself in an outdoor bathroom at Milwee Middle School in Longwood, Florida, with an Airsoft gun painted entirely black to disguise it as a Beretta 92. After the weapon was discovered by Cotey, Penley forced him into the closet and shut off the lights in the classroom. The student immediately fled and informed security and later phoned police. SWAT arrived on the scene shortly thereafter, while a negotiator attempted to initiate contact with Penley. After a twenty-minute stand-off he aimed the pistol at Lieutenant Michael Weippert who responded by shooting him.

He was transported to Orlando Regional Medical Center where he remained on life support for two days before dying of his wounds. Several of his organs were removed and used as transplants. Seminole County Sheriff Don Eslinger said the boy was suicidal and would not respond to negotiators who tried to talk him down in the bathroom.

Some students at the school told the media after the incident that they knew he had "something planned". Police have been criticized for initiating action instead of waiting for Penley's father to arrive so that his father might convince him to surrender. The Orlando Sentinel reported that Ralph Penley was not told of events until after his son was shot. The Florida Department of Law Enforcement investigated the shooting and found it entirely justified, as Penley aimed an apparent weapon at the deputy.

Aftermath
Penley's organs were donated by his family. His death gave nine people vital organs. Christopher Penley has also had a game room at the Landmark Church dedicated to him and a Youth center. The youth center the Adolescent Life Coaching Center opened in honor of Christopher Penley's memory and to give a place for the voice of youth to be heard.

Penley's family filed a lawsuit against police; however, a judge dismissed the suit after determining that the shooting was justified.

See also
Suicide by cop
List of school-related attacks

References

External links
 "Florida Eighth-Grader Shot by Deputies Dies" (Reuters) accessed January 14, 2006
 "Milwee Middle School Web Site"
 Orlando Sentinel
 Candide’s Notebooks 
 WESH 2 News
 CNN Transcript
 Center Dedicated to Christopher Penley

2006 deaths
American children
Longwood, Florida
Deaths by firearm in Florida
People shot dead by law enforcement officers in the United States
Organ transplant donors
Education in Seminole County, Florida
Law enforcement in Florida